Michelle Bauer (born October 1, 1958) is an American actress, model, and scream queen.

Early life
Bauer was born and raised in Simi Valley, California.

Career
Bauer was Penthouse magazine's Pet of the Month for July 1981 and also appeared in many other adult magazines during the early to mid 1980s, under a number of different names.

Bauer also starred in the pornographic film Cafe Flesh (1982) under the name of Pia Snow. She states that she was happy to appear in the film, and on the covers of other X-rated films, but insisted on a double for the sex scenes. Bauer appeared in several other pornographic titles under her Pia Snow moniker, including Bad Girls, Bizarre People, Nightdreams, and others.

Bauer's Penthouse centerfold appearance led to acting for the Playboy Channel and a film try-out for director Fred Olen Ray. Ray liked her audition, and offered her the part if she would be willing to dye her hair black. Her first B-movie was The Tomb (1986), it would be the first of many. Along with Linnea Quigley and Brinke Stevens, Bauer became the most prominent B-movie scream queens in the late 1980s.

Her life and career are one of the main subjects of the 2011 documentary Screaming in High Heels: The Rise and Fall of the Scream Queen Era by director Jason Paul Collum. She returned for the 2020 follow up Screaming in High Heels: The Reunion which reunited her with fellow actors and subjects Linnea Quigley and Brinke Stevens.

Personal life
Bauer retained her married name as a screen name. After she and her husband divorced, he filed a lawsuit requesting she not use it for her films. She tried appearing as Michelle McClellan, using the name of her second husband, in Hollywood Chainsaw Hookers (1988), but the press resisted, so she returned to Bauer, which the first husband eventually accepted.

Selected filmography

 Bad Girls (1981)
 Nightdreams (1981)
 Café Flesh (1982)
 Homework (1982)
 Terror on Tape (1983)
 Special Request (1984)
 Tied & Tickled (1985)
 Tomboy (1985)
 Cavegirl (1985)
 Beverly Hills Girls (1986)
 Reform School Girls (1986)
 The Tomb (1986)
 Lust for Freedom (1987)
 Night of the Living Babes (1987)
 Terror Night (1987)
 Hollywood Chainsaw Hookers (1988)
 Demonwarp (1988)
 Nightmare Sisters (1988)
 Death Row Diner (1988)
 Lady Avenger (1988)
 Sorority Babes in the Slimeball Bowl-O-Rama (1988)
 Beverly Hills Vamp (1988)
 Dr. Alien (1989)
 Assault of the Party Nerds (1989)
 The Jigsaw Murders (1989)
 Virgin High (1991)
 Puppet Master III: Toulon's Revenge (1991)
 Camp Fear (1991)
 Evil Toons (1992)
 Naked Instinct (1993)
 Dinosaur Island (1994)
 Red Lips (1995)
 Bikini Drive-In (1995)
 Vampire Vixens from Venus (1995)
 Assault of the Party Nerds Part 2: Heavy Petting Detective (1995)
 Attack of the 60 Foot Centerfold (1995)
 Witch Academy (1995)
 Mari-Cookie and the Killer Tarantula in 8 Legs to Love You (1998)
 Lust for Frankenstein (1998)
 Blood and Honor (2000)
 Tomb of the Werewolf (2004)
 The Naked Monster (2005)
 The Bikini Escort Company (2006)
 Gingerdead Man 2: Passion of the Crust (2008)
 Voodoo Dollz (2008)
 Megaconda (2010)
 1313: Actor Slash Model (2011)
 1313: Cougar Cult (2012)
 1313: Bermuda Triangle (2012)
 The Trouble With Barry (2013)
 3 Scream Queens (2014)
 Sorority Babes in the Slimeball Bowl-O-Rama 2 (2022)

References

External links

 
 
 
 

1958 births
Living people
People from Montebello, California
Pornographic film actors from California
Penthouse Pets
American female adult models
American film actresses
American pornographic film actresses
Actresses from California
20th-century American actresses
21st-century American actresses
Female models from California